Group 4 of the 1978 FIFA World Cup began on 3 June and ended on 11 June 1978. The group consisted of Iran, Netherlands, Peru, and Scotland.

Standings

Matches

Peru vs Scotland

Netherlands vs Iran

Scotland vs Iran

Netherlands vs Peru

Peru vs Iran

Scotland vs Netherlands

References
Arkivperu.com
FIFA.com
El Comercio 
The Sons of Scotland
Netherlands-Peru, game report
Netherlands-Peru, game report

Groups
Iran at the 1978 FIFA World Cup
Scotland at the 1978 FIFA World Cup
Netherlands at the 1978 FIFA World Cup
Peru at the 1978 FIFA World Cup